Shady Valley is an unincorporated community in Johnson County in the northeastern corner of the U.S. state of Tennessee. It is just outside Cherokee National Forest. Shady Valley is also the name of the valley in which the town is located, between Holston Mountain ""it is the twin city of Mountain City Tennessee, on the northwest, and the Iron Mountains to the southeast. At 2,785 feet, it is the second-highest community in Tennessee.

Natural history

After the Pleistocene ice ages, species and ecosystems that had shifted southward often survived in local refugia. As a result, cold-adapted ecosystems, such as cranberry bogs, remain in Shady Valley, far south of their usual range. Shady Valley once contained an estimated 10,000 acres (40 km) of boreal cranberry bogs.

Recreation
The roads that run in and around the town are popular among motorcyclists since nearby mountains provide nearly 500 pigtail curves to navigate. The most popular road for motorcyclists is US-421,
which offers many challenging curves.

Economy
Shady Valley has one small general store; a locally owned restaurant, the 'Raceway Grill'; a U.S. Post Office; and until 2020 the Shady Valley Elementary School, now closed.

The town holds its annual Cranberry Festival the second weekend in October with food, a parade and auctions.

See also
 Appalachian bogs
 Holston Mountain
 Iron Mountains
 Laurel Bloomery, Tennessee

References

External links
 

Appalachian bogs
Unincorporated communities in Tennessee
Unincorporated communities in Johnson County, Tennessee